The 53rd edition of the annual Four Hills Tournament was held in the traditional venues: Oberstorf and Garmisch-Partenkirchen in Germany, and Innsbruck and Bischofshofen in Austria. 

The Four Hills tournament counts as part of the World Cup season. Before the competition in Oberstorf, eight out of twenty-eight events were already held. Janne Ahonen had won seven of them, and placed second in the only one he did not. This early-season dominance of the Finnish athlete, who had already won the Four Hills tournament twice before, made him the favourite for the title, and Ahonen did not disappoint. He won the first three events, though he failed to become the second ski jumper after Sven Hannawald to win all four events of the tournament when runners-up  Martin Höllwarth snatched the victory at the final event in Bischofshofen.

Format

At each of the four events, a qualification round would be held. The 50 best jumpers would qualify for the competition. The fifteen athletes leading the World Cup at the time would qualify automatically. In case of an omitted qualification or a result that would normally result in elimination, they would instead qualify as 50th.

Unlike the procedure at normal World Cup events, the 50 qualified athletes would be paired up for the first round of the final event, with the winner qualifying for the second round. The rounds start with the duel between #26 and #25 from the qualification round, followed by #27 vs #24, up to #50 vs #1. The five best duel losers, so-called 'Lucky Losers' also qualify for the second round.

For the tournament ranking, the total points earned from each jump are added together. The World Cup points collected during the four events are disregarded in this ranking.

World Cup Standings

The standings at the time of the tournament, after seven out of twenty-two events, were as follows:

Participating nations and athletes

The number of athletes a nation was allowed to nominate was dependent on previous results. In addition, a "national group" from the host nation is added to each event.

The defending champion was Sigurd Pettersen. Six other competitors had also previously won the Four Hills tournament: Andreas Goldberger in 1992-93 and 1994-95, Janne Ahonen in 1998-99 and 2002-03, Primož Peterka in 1996-97, Kazuyoshi Funaki in 1997-98, Andreas Widhölzl in 1999-00 and Adam Małysz in 2000-01.

The following athletes were nominated:

Results

Oberstorf
 Schattenbergschanze, Oberstorf
28-29 December 2004

Defending champion Sigurd Pettersen was not among the fifteen pre-qualified jumpers, and only placed 63rd in the qualification round. Thus, he failed to qualify.

In the final event, Roar Ljøkelsøy's jump over 140.0 meters catapulted him from 18th place after the first round onto 2nd place overall.

Qualification winner:  Janne Ahonen

Garmisch-Partenkirchen
 Große Olympiaschanze, Garmisch-Partenkirchen
31 December 2004 - 1 January 2005

Qualification winner:  Janne Ahonen

Innsbruck
 Bergiselschanze, Innsbruck
02-03 January 2005

Qualification winner:  Janne Ahonen

Bischofshofen
 Paul-Ausserleitner-Schanze, Bischofshofen
05-6 January 2005

Qualification winner:  Martin Höllwarth

Final ranking

After failing to qualify in Oberstorf, the defending Four Hills champion, Sigurd Pettersen, ultimately ranked 22nd overall (678.1 points).

References

External links
 FIS website
 Four Hills Tournament web site

 
Fis Ski Jumping World Cup, 2005-06
Fis Ski Jumping World Cup, 2005-06